Teenager was an art rock, punk dance band formed in 2004 by Nick Littlemore as a side project from his electronic dance group Pnau, and Phillipa "Pip" Brown (later known as Ladyhawke) on guitar (ex-member of New Zealand band Two Lane Blacktop).

In 2006 their debut single "Pony" was issued ahead of the album, Thirteen, which was followed by a second single, "Bound and Gagged". The album had been recorded over three years in studios in Sydney, London, New York, Paris and Los Angeles. The track "Pony" is featured in the soundtrack of the video game Grand Theft Auto IV. It also features Aiden Nemeth from Wolfmother on guitar. By 2007 Brown had left to pursue her solo career as Ladyhawke, and Littlemore returned to his work with Pnau and later also formed Empire of the Sun.

History
Teenager was formed in 2004 in Sydney by Nick Littlemore as a side-project to his main group Pnau which had released their second album Again in October 2003. Phillipa "Pip" Brown had left her native New Zealand after the disbandment of her hard rock group Two Lane Blacktop in 2003. Originally living in Melbourne, Brown was contacted by Littlemore who asked her to join on lead guitar. Littlemore was the lead vocalist and keyboardist.

In 2006 Teenager issued their debut single, "Pony" on the independent label,  Timberyard Records. It was followed by the album, Thirteen and the related single "Bound and Gagged". Littlemore's brother James directed the music video for "Bound and Gagged". The album had been recorded over three years in studios in Sydney, London, New York, Paris and Los Angeles. For the album the duo of Brown and Littlemore used Sonic Youth's Lee Ranaldo (on guitar) and Steve Shelley (on drums), and Thierry Muller (on synthesiser) as session musicians. Additional musicians include Luke Steele (of Sleepy Jackson), Kim Moyes (The Presets), and guitarist Rowland S. Howard. Littlemore's Pnau bandmate Peter Mayes mixed seven of the ten tracks.

Mess + Noises Craig Mathieson described the album as "a pop record, albeit a particularly exotic species that equally suggests creative guile and hints of self-indulgence ... 'Pony' is the closest the album comes to cheap genre holidaying, approximating rock attitude when the organic and desperate growth of 'Bound And Gagged' is so much more impressive". Brown and Littlemore co-wrote "Alone Again" and "West" for Teenager. Soon after the album's appearance Brown left to concentrate on her career as Ladyhawke, she later described working with Littlemore:

From late 2006 Teenager performed live with a line-up of Brown, Littlemore, Deano Cameron on bass guitar and Oscar Wuts on drums (both ex-Degrees.K, a New Zealand band). They undertook an east coast tour in April 2007. In September 2007 Teenager issued "Bound & Gagged" in the United Kingdom on Godlike and Electric and Thirteen followed there in October. Gigwise's Luisa Mateus found the duo "bring lascivious grooves to a seductively orientated debut, titled 'Thirteen' ... [it] draws on fast paced musical formations, a mismatch of sounds, poppy in places, but mainly littered with dirty but enthralling bass lines, sexually charged guitar rifts and sass by the bucket load". By that time Littlemore had returned to recording with his main group which issued their third album, Pnau in December 2007. Brown guested as lead vocalist and co-writer on "Embrace" which was issued as a single in 2008. In 2007 as Ladyhawke, Brown had relocated to London and, in April 2008, issued her debut solo single "Back of the Van". In 2007 Littlemore and Steele formed Empire of the Sun, and in August 2008 they issued their debut single, "Walking on a Dream".

Discography

Albums
 Thirteen (2006)

References

Australian musical duos
Australian rock music groups
Musical groups established in 2004
Musical groups disestablished in 2007
New South Wales musical groups
Timberyard Records artists